is a Japanese women's professional shogi player ranked 6-dan. She is also the career leader in women's professional shogi major titles.

Satomi is also the first female to have been promoted to Japan Shogi Association's apprentice rank of 3-dan. She is also the first women's professional to apply for and be allowed to take the Japan Shogi Association's Professional Admission Test.

Early life
Satomi was born in Izumo, Shimane on March 2, 1992. In 2003, she represented Shimane Prefecture in the 28th  as a
fifth-grade elementary school student, and advanced to the semifinals before losing to future shogi professional Takuya Nishida.

Later in 2003, Satomi entered the Japan Shogi Association's Women's Professional Apprentice League under the guidance of shogi professional . She was awarded the rank of women's professional 2-kyū in October 2004.

Women's shogi professional
In September 2008, Satomi defeated Tomomi Kai to in the final of the  challenger tournament to advance to the best-of-three title match against Ichiyo Shimizu. Satomi's victory over Kai also meant that she satisfied the criteria for promotion to women's professional 2-dan. Satomi went on to defeat Shimizu 2 games to none to win her first major title. Satomi successfully defended her title from 2009 (17th Kurashiki Tōka Cup) until 2012 (20th Kurashiki Tōka Cup). Satomi's victory in 2012 qualified her for the lifetime title of "Queen Kurashiki Toka", thus making her at 20 years old the youngest women's professional to ever qualify for a lifetime title. Satomi lost to Kai 2 games to 1 in the final of the 21st Kurashiki Tōka Cup in November 2013, but recaptured the title from Kai in November 2015 by the score of 2 games to none in the 23rd Kurashiki Tōka Cup. She successfully defended her title in both 2016 (24th Kurashiki Tōka Cup) and 2017 (25th Kurashiki Tōka Cup).　

In February 2019, Satomi defended her Women's Meijin title against Sae Itō, winning the 45th Women's Meijin match 3 games to 1. Satomi's win was the tenth consecutive time she's won the Meijin title, which tied the record for consecutive wins of a women's title set by Naoko Hayashiba in 1991.

Satomi earned the right to challenge Tomoka Nishiyama for the 12th Women's  title in AprilMay 2019, but Nishiyama defended her title 3 games to 1.

In June 2018, Satomi lost her  title to challenger Mana Watanabe 3 games to 1 in the 29th Women's Ōi title match. The two met again the following year in the 30th Women's Ōi title match (MayJune 2019), and Satomi regained her title 3 games to 1. The victory was Satomi's fifth Women's Ōi title overall, which not only returned her to  status, but also earned her the lifetime title "Queen Ōi".

In September 2019, Satomi defeated Kai 3 games to none to win the inaugural . The win made Satomi the first 6-crown title holder in women's professional shogi. Satomi, however, was only able to retain her 6-crown status for about two months and dropped back down to 5-crown status after losing the 41st Women's Ōshō title to Nishiyama 2 games to 1.

In November 2019, Satomi defended her Kurashiki Tōka title by defeating Itō 2 games to 1 in the 27th Kurashiki Tōka title match.

In OctoberDecember 2019, Satomi defended her Women's Ōza title against Nishiyama, the third time in six months the two met in a major title match. Satomi lost the 9th Women's Ōza match 3 games to 1 to drop back to a 4-crown title holder status.

Satomi won the Women's Meijin title for the eleventh consecutive time when she defeated Yuki Taniguchi 3 games to none to win the 46th Women's Meijin match. The victory also gave Satomi sole possession of the record for the most consecutive wins of a women's major title.

In June 2020, Satomi successfully defended her Women's Ōi crown by defeating Momoko Katō 3 games to none.

In JulyAugust 2020, Satomi defeated Hatsumi Ueda 3 games to 2 to win the 2nd Seirei title match. Satomi won the first two games, lost the next two, but came back to win the final game of the match and defend her title.

In November 2020, Satomi successfully defended her Kurashiki Tōka title by defeating Hiroe Nakai 2 games to none to win the 28th Kurashiki Tōka title.

Satomi defended her Women's Meijin title for the twelfth consecutive time when she defeated Momoko Katō 3 games to none to win the 47th Women's Meijin title match in JanuaryFebruary 2021. The victory gave Satomi her 43rd women's major title overall which tied her  with Ichiyo Shimizu for the most ever.

Satomi successfully defended her Women's Ōi crown in June 2021 by defeating Kotomi Yamane 3 games to none to win the 32nd Women's Ōi title match. The victory was Satomi's 44th major title and made her the all-time Women's professional shogi major title leader. She returned to 5-crown status in November 2021 after defeating  2 games to 1 to win the 43rd Women's Ōshō title. Later that same month, however, she was unable to defend her Seirei title against  and lost the 3rd Seirei title match (SeptemberNovember 2021) 3 games to 2. Satomi and Katō also faced each other in the best-of-three 29th Kurashiki Tōka Cup title match (November 2021) with Satomi winning 2 games to 1 for her her twelfth Kurashiki Tōka Cup title overall. A few weeks later, Satomi returned to 5-crown status after defeating Nishiyama in the 11th Ōza title match (October 2021December 2021) 3 games to none. The win was Satomi's fifth Ōza title overall which qualified her for the "Queen Ōza" title.

In February 2022, Satomi lost the 47th Women's Meijin title (JanuaryFebruary 2022) to  3 games to 1. It was the first time since 2009 that she was unable to successfully defend her Women's Meiiin title.

Satomi successfully defended her Women's Ōi title in June 2022 by defeating  3 games to 1 to win the 33rd Women's Ōi title match (April 2022June 2022). In AprilJune 2022, she also challenged Nishiyama for the latter's Jo-Ō in the 15th Mynavi Women's Open title match, but Nishiyama won the match 3 games to 2 to defend her title. Satomi, however, did recapture the Seirei title by defeating  in the 4th Seirei Title Match (JulyAugust 2022) 3 games to none to return to 5-crown status. 

On October 21, 2022, Satomi returned to 6-crown status after defeating  in the best-of-seven 2nd  title match (August 2022October 2022) 4 games to 3. The win was Satomi's 50th major title overall. Satomi's return to 6-crown status, however, was short-lived after she lost the 34th Women's Ōshō title match (October 2022) a week later to Nishiyama 3 games to 2. Satomi and Nishiyama faced each other yet again in a major title match a few days later with Nishiyama challenging Satomi for her Kurashiki Tōka Cup title. This time, Satomi was able to successfully defend her title by winning the 30th Kurashiki Tōka Cup title match (November 2022) 2 games to none. A few weeks later on December 23, 2022, Satomi successfully defended her Women's Ōza title by defeating  3 games to 2 in the 12th Women's Ōza title match (OctoberDecember 2022).

Promotion history
Satomi has been promoted as follows.
 2-kyū: October 1, 2004
 1-kyū: April 1, 2006
 1-dan: February 22, 2007
 2-dan: September 29, 2008
 3-dan: April 1, 2009
 4-dan: February 10, 2010
 5-dan: October 18, 2011
 6-dan: April 1, 2020

Note: All ranks are women's professional ranks.

Major titles
Satomi has appeared in major title matches 66 times and has won a total of 52 titles. In September 2019, she became the first 6-crown title holder in women's professional shogi.

Awards and honors
Satomi has received a number of Japan Shogi Association Annual Shogi Awards and other awards in recognition of her accomplishments in shogi and contributions made to Japanese society.

Annual shogi awards
34th Annual Awards (April 2006March 2007): Women's Professional Award
36th Annual Awards (April 2008March 2009): Women's Professional Award
37th Annual Awards (April 2009March 2010): Women's Professional of the Year
38th Annual Awards (April 2010March 2011): Women's Professional of the Year
39th Annual Awards (April 2011March 2012): Women's Professional of the Year
40th Annual Awards (April 2012March 2013): Women's Professional of the Year, Game of the Year Special Prize
41st Annual Awards (April 2013March 2014): Women's Professional of the Year
43rd Annual Awards (April 2015March 2016): Women's Professional of the Year
44th Annual Awards (April 2016March 2017): Women's Professional of the Year, Game of the Year Special Prize
45th Annual Awards (April 2017March 2018): Women's Professional of the Year
46th Annual Awards (April 2018March 2019): Women's Professional of the Year, Women's Professional Game of the Year
47th Annual Awards (April 2019March 2020): Women's Professional of the Year, Women's Game of the Year
48th Annual Awards (April 2020March 2021): Women's professional of the Year, Women's Professional Game of the Year
49th Annual Awards (April 2021March 2022): Women's professional of the Year, Women's Professional Game of the Year

Other awards
2007, March: Shimane Prefecture Cultural Activity Award
2010, March: Shimane Prefecture Meritorious Person Award

Notable results against regular professionals

On June 28, 2019, Satomi defeated shogi professional Ryūma Tonari in the preliminary round of the 91st Kisei tournament to become the first women's professional to win four consecutive official games against regular professionals. She was, however, unable to extend winning streak to five games when she lost to Takahiro Ōhashi in her next game against a regular professional. On July 21, 2019, Satomi became just the third women's professional to win a NHK Cup TV Tournament game against a male professional when she defeated Issei Takazaki in Round 1 of the tournament.

On May 27, 2022, Satomi defeated Yūta Komori in the preliminary round of the 48th Kiō tournament to become the first women's professional to qualify for the main challenger tournament of a major title. Her record against regular professionals after this win improved to 10 wins and 4 losses over the last 14 games, satisfying the criteria to qualify for the Professional Admission Test. In addition to Komori, the regular professionals Satomi defeated during this period included former Kiō challenger Kei Honda, B1 class professional Shingo Sawada, and 2022 Ōi league winner Takashi Ikenaga. Satomi is the first women's professional to qualify for the professional admission test.

Apprentice professional
In April 2011, Satomi, who was already quite successful as a women's shogi professional, informed the Japan Shogi Association of her desire to enter its apprentice school at the rank of apprentice professional 1-kyū in an attempt to obtain full professional status. A series of three official games against existing shogi apprentices were arranged as her entrance exam. She split the first two games held on May 3, 2011, but then won the third game on May 21, 2011, to pass the exam. She was awarded the rank of apprentice 1-kyū that same day.

In January 2012, Satomi became the first female under the current apprentice system to be promoted to the rank of apprentice 1-dan after she achieved the threshold of 12 wins and 4 losses in apprentice school play. In July 2013, Satomi then became the first female to be promoted to apprentice 2-dan after once again reaching 12 wins and 4 losses. In December of that same year, she became the first female to be promoted to apprentice 3-dan, thus earning her the right to be the first female to participate in the 3-Dan League: the final stage for those aspiring to be awarded regular professional status.

Satomi's first season of 3-dan league play was supposed to be the 55th 3-dan League (April 2014September 2014), but health issues forced her to take a leave of absence from all professional games from April 1, 2014, until August 31, 2014. Satomi's health problems did not improve, so her leave of absence was subsequently extended to December 31, 2014; this meant she would miss the 56th (October 2014March 2015) 3-dan League as well. On November 10, 2014, the JSA announced that Satomi would be returning to official women's professional shogi play as of January 1, 2015, but that she was being allowed to withdraw from the 57th (April 2015October 2015) 3-dan league.

Satomi's returned from her leave of absence for the 58th (October 2015March 2016) 3-dan League, and finished with a losing record of 5 wins and 13 losses. Her records in the 59th (April 2016September 2016), 60th (October 2016March 2017) and 61st (April 2017September 2017) 3-dan Leagues were 711, 810 and 711 respectively.

Satomi was already 25 years old when she started 62nd (October 2017March 2018) 3-dan league play which meant she needed to either win the league outright and obtain full professional status, or finish with a winning record (10 wins) to avoid losing her qualifications for the apprentice school due to the 26-year-old age limit set in place by the JSA. Satomi's record after twelve games was 7 wins and 5 losses, so it seemed like she might be able to qualify for a one-season extension to continue her attempt for full professional status. However, she proceeded to lose her next four games which meant the best she could finish was 9 wins and 9 losses, which confirmed that she would have to leave the apprentice school. The option of becoming a "regular" professional via the Professional Admission Test remains open to her, and her leaving the apprentice school does not affect her status as a women's professional player.

Professional Admission Test
On June 28, 2022, the JSA announced that it had accepted Satomi's application for the Professional Admission Test. Satomi was the first woman to be accepted for the test. She satisfied the criteria for the test the previous month when she defeated a regular professional in the official tournament play. Satomi's test consisted of a best-of-five test match against the five most recently promoted regular professionals with Satomi needing to win three of the five games to be awarded regular professional status as a "Free Class" professional. The schedule was for one game to be played a month starting in August 2022, under official game conditions.

The five professionals Satomi was scheduled to play were Kenshi Tokuda (Game 1), Reo Okabe (Game 2), Mikio Kariyama (Game 3), Tomoki Yokoyama (Game 4) and Akihiro Takada (Game 5). The time control for each game was three hours per player which was then followed a byoyomi time control of thirty seconds per move. A furigoma was held prior to Game 1 to determine who moved first, and then the first move alternated between players for the remaining games so that Satomi would never move first or second for two consecutive games. The games were scheduled to take place at the JSA headquarters in Tokyo and its Kansai Branch in Osaka. Game 1 took place on August 18 in Osaka with Tokuda moving first and ultimately winning in 127 moves. Game 2 took place in Tokyo on September 22, with Satomi moving first. Despite having the advantage of the first move, Satomi lost the game in 132 moves. Game 3 took place in Osaka on October 13 with Satomi needing to win to have any chance of being promoted; Satomi lost the game in 103 moves which meant she had failed the test, thus making Games 4 and 5 unnecessary.

Personal life
Satomi's younger sister Saki is also a women's professional shogi player. The two are the third pair of sisters to be awarded women's professional status by the JSA.

References

External links
ShogiHub: Professional Player Info · Satomi, Kana
Shogi Fan:
Satomi wins Kurashiki Touka tournament
Satomi defends Ouza title

Japanese shogi players
Living people
Women's professional shogi players
Professional shogi players from Shimane Prefecture
1992 births
Women's Meijin
Women's Ōshō
Women's Ōi
Kurashiki Tōka Cup
Queen (shogi)
Women's Ōza
Seirei title holders
Hakurei title holders